{{Infobox settlement
| official_name          = City of Alegrete
| settlement_type        = Municipality
| nickname                = "Baita Chão" ("Hell of a Ground")
| motto                  =
| image_skyline          = 00 DSC00509 lagoa.jpg
| image_caption          = Fountain at the lake of Neytha Ramos Park
| image_flag             = Bandeira de Alegrete (Rio Grande do Sul).svg
| image_seal             = Brasao_alegrete.svg
| image_map              = Locator map of Alegrete in Rio Grande do Sul.svg
| map_caption            = Location in Rio Grande do Sul and Brazil
| subdivision_type       = Country
| subdivision_name       = Brazil
| subdivision_type1      = Region
| subdivision_name1      = Sul
| subdivision_type2      = State
| subdivision_name2      = Rio Grande do Sul
| leader_title           = Mayor
| leader_name            = Márcio Amaral
| leader_party           = MDB
| established_title      = Founded
| established_date       = October 25, 1831
| area_footnotes         =
| area_total_km2         = 7,804
| population_footnotes   = 
| population_as_of       = 2020 
| population_total       = 73,028
| population_density_km2 = auto
| timezone               = BRT
| utc_offset             = −3
| timezone_DST           = 
| utc_offset_DST         = 
| coordinates            = 
| elevation_footnotes    =
| elevation_m            = 102
| blank_name             = HDI (2000)
| blank_info             = 0.793 – 
| website                = alegrete.rs.gov.br
| footnotes              =
}}Alegrete''' is a municipality in Rio Grande do Sul located in southern Brazil. Its inhabitants are called Alegretenses''.

Alegrete was settled in 1816 and became a municipality in 1857. It is the hometown of the abolitionist leader Franklin Gomes Souto, of the politician, diplomat and statesman Osvaldo Aranha, first President of the United Nations General Assembly, and of the  Brazilian poet Mário Quintana. Every September 20 (Ragamuffin War Day), about 8,000 young, adult and old horsemen and horsewomen parade through its streets, using their native costumes and riding their horses with trappings.

Alegrete is served by Gaudêncio Machado Ramos Airport.

The municipality contains part of the  Ibirapuitã Biological Reserve, a fully protected conservation unit created in 1982 to preserve an area of the pampas biome.

References

External links
Alegrete (Google Maps)
Alegrete (Official Website)

Municipalities in Rio Grande do Sul
Capitals of former nations
1816 establishments in Brazil